Nephelotus is a genus of longhorn beetles of the subfamily Lamiinae, containing the following species:

 Nephelotus alboplagiatus Breuning, 1938
 Nephelotus aurivillii Ritsema, 1914
 Nephelotus conspersus (J. Thomson, 1865)
 Nephelotus cristipennis Breuning, 1954

References

Lamiini